Sergio Matusalem Goyri Pérez (born 14 November 1958) is a Mexican actor, particularly known for his performances in soap operas. In 2019 he received significant negative coverage after complaining about the film community nominating Yalitza Aparicio for an Oscar, stating it was unthinkable that a "damn Indian woman" who only says "yes ma’am, no ma’am" could receive the award.

Filmography

Awards and nominations

TVyNovelas Awards

References

External links
 
 Biografía en esmas.com (in Spanish)
 

1958 births
Living people
Mexican male film actors
Mexican male telenovela actors
Male actors from Puebla
People from Puebla (city)